was a Japanese football player.

Club career
Tsugitani was born in Hyogo Prefecture on June 25, 1940. After graduating from Kwansei Gakuin University, he joined Mitsubishi Motors in 1963. In 1965,Mitsubishi Motors  joined new league Japan Soccer League. He retired in 1967. He played 40 games and scored 16 goals in the league.

National team career
On August 15, 1961, when he was a Kwansei Gakuin University student, he debuted for Japan national team against Indonesia. He played at 1962 Asian Games. In 1964, he was selected Japan for 1964 Summer Olympics in Tokyo, but he did not compete. He played 12 games and scored 4 goals for Japan until 1965.

On June 2, 1978, Tsugitani died of cirrhosis in Kobe at the age of 37.

National team statistics

References

External links

Japan National Football Team Database

1940 births
1978 deaths
Kwansei Gakuin University alumni
Association football people from Hyōgo Prefecture
Japanese footballers
Japan international footballers
Japan Soccer League players
Urawa Red Diamonds players
Olympic footballers of Japan
Footballers at the 1964 Summer Olympics
Footballers at the 1962 Asian Games
Association football midfielders
Deaths from cirrhosis
Asian Games competitors for Japan
Alcohol-related deaths in Japan